Berberis pumila is a species of shrub native to Oregon and northern California.

Berberis pumila is evergreen, rarely more than 40 cm tall. It has compound leaves and dark blue berries.

The compound leaves place this species in the group sometimes segregated as the genus Mahonia.

References

pumila
Flora of California
Flora of Oregon
Flora of the Cascade Range
Flora of the Sierra Nevada (United States)
Endemic flora of the United States
Flora without expected TNC conservation status